This is a list of Estonian television related events from 2014.

Events
1 March - Tanja is selected to represent Estonia at the 2014 Eurovision Song Contest with her song "Amazing". She is selected to be the twentieth Estonian Eurovision entry during Eesti Laul held at the Nokia Concert Hall in Tallinn.

Debuts
Padjaklubi (TV3)

Television shows

1990s
Õnne 13 (ETV; 1993–present)

2000s
Eesti otsib superstaari (TV3; 2007–present)

Ending this year

Births

Deaths

See also
2014 in Estonia